Bernard was an Irish priest in the twelfth century: the first recorded Archdeacon of Down.

References

Archdeacons of Down